Crazy Eights is a 2006 B-horror film that follows the story of six companions as they fill the last request of a dead friend. The film is distributed by the After Dark Horrorfest which annually releases an eight-part movie collection that typically is likened towards the movie genres of horror and thriller, Crazy Eights being part of the 2007 series released by the movie collection.

Cast
 Dina Meyer as Jennifer Jones
 George Newbern as Father Lyle Dey
 Traci Lords as Gina Conte
 Dan DeLuca as Wayne Morrison
 Frank Whaley as Brent Sykes
 Gabrielle Anwar as Beth Patterson
 Karen Beriss as Karen
 Michael Gabel as Dr. Pike

Production
James K. Jones directed this film and Dan DeLuca was the main producer and writer.

The film was released in select theaters on November 9, 2007. The film runs for a total of 80 minutes. The film was distributed by After Dark Films. The film was produced in the United States.

Reception

Awards
Part of the After Dark Horrorfest film series "8 Films to Die For".

Critical response
The film has received negative reviews from critics. On Rotten Tomatoes the film has 3 reviews from critics, all negative.

A reviewer for the website Dread Central expressed disappointment with the film's plot, recommending that viewers "forget everything about the plot and enjoy the visuals". Brent McKnight, a reviewer for online magazine PopMatters, expressed a slightly more negative view when reviewing the film upon its release to home video, summarizing "With no real plot, and no real characters, Crazy Eights is a weak, toothless attempt at a horror film".

See also
 After Dark Horrorfest

References

External links

2006 films
American horror films
2006 horror films
2000s English-language films
2000s American films